Norbury Manor is a 15th-century Elizabethan manor house and the adjoining 13th-century stone-built medieval Norbury Hall, known as The Old Manor in Norbury near Ashbourne, Derbyshire. It is a Grade I listed building.

The manor was owned by the FitzHerbert family from the 12th century, granted to William Fitz-Herbert in fee-farm by the Tutbury Priory in 1125. In 1444, Nicholas FitzHerbert and his son Ralph gave their land in Osmaston, along with other lands in Foston and Church Broughton, to the priory to purchase the manor.

The manor house built by William FitzHerbert in the mid-14th century is remarkably well preserved. The Old Manor is noted for its historic architectural features including a rare king post, medieval fireplace, a Tudor door and some 17th-century Flemish glass. The adjoining Tudor house was built by Ralph FitzHerbert in the mid-15th century and rebuilt in about 1680, but retains many of the original features.

The accompanying gardens include a parterre herb garden.

The Hall was badly damaged by Parliamentary forces during the English Civil War and after the death of Sir John FitzHerbert in 1649 was in a ruinous state and fell into disuse.

On the death of John FitzHerbert in 1649, the estate passed to his cousin William FitzHerbert of Swynnerton Hall, Staffordshire who rebuilt the Tudor portion of the property in about 1680. The Fitzherberts sold the estate in 1881.

Norbury Hall has been owned by the National Trust since 1987 and is currently used as holiday accommodation, having previously been let to tenants. The Old Manor, however, is open to the public on Friday mornings and Saturday afternoons during the summer.

Junior branches of the FitzHerbert family had seats at Tissington Hall and Somersal Herbert Hall.

See also
Grade I listed buildings in Derbyshire
Listed buildings in Norbury and Roston

References

External links
 The Old Manor information at the National Trust
   Fitzherbert Derbyshire Seats

Grade I listed buildings in Derbyshire
National Trust properties in Derbyshire
Tourist attractions in Derbyshire
Historic house museums in Derbyshire
Derbyshire Dales